"Color Him Father" is a song written by Richard Lewis Spencer and recorded by American rhythm and blues group the Winstons. It was released in 1969 as their debut single for Metromedia and was a No.7 hit on the Billboard Hot 100 that year, representing the Winstons' highest entry there. A cover by American singer Linda Martell on Plantation Records also charted in the same year, reaching No. 22 on the Hot Country Songs chart.

Background and content

The "Color Him Father" B-side is "Amen, Brother", an instrumental interpretation of the gospel standard "Amen". The Winstons recorded it in early 1969 in Atlanta, Georgia. With the rise of hip hop in the 1980s, the break was widely sampled and became a staple of drum and bass and jungle music. It has been used on thousands of tracks of many genres, making it one of the most sampled recordings of all time.

"Color Him Father" is a song about a boy expressing his love for his stepfather. The stepdad is portrayed as a hardworking and loving gentleman who married the narrator's widowed mom, who had seven children, and embraced them as his own after her first husband was "killed in the war". ("She said she thought that she could never love again/And then there he stood with that big, wide grin.") The song's lyrics resonated strongly with the public in 1969, the height of the Vietnam War. The word "color", in the song, means "designate" and follows the 'color' motif set in Barbra Streisand's 1963 release of "My Coloring Book." The song served as a major musical inspiration for the 2016 track "Celebrate" by Anderson .Paak.

Release and chart performance
It was released in 1969, and reached No.2 on the R&B charts and No.7 on the Billboard Hot 100 that same year. Its composer, Richard Lewis Spencer, won a Grammy Award for Best R&B song in 1970.

The Winstons' original version was released as a single, and the B-side contained an instrumental track titled "Amen, Brother". "Amen, Brother" contains what has now become one of the most heavily sampled drum breaks in the history of electronic music, especially jungle and breakbeat hardcore.  This break has become known as the Amen Break.

Track listing
7" vinyl single
 "Color Him Father" – 3:06
 "Amen, Brother" – 2:35

Charts

Weekly charts

Cover versions
"Color Him Father" has been notably covered multiple times by performers of various musical styles. Lorene Mann released "Color Him Father" on her 1969 RCA album A Mann Called Lorene. O C Smith released it on his 1969 Columbia album O.C. Smith at Home. Bobby Womack recorded the song for his 1994 album Resurrection. Keb' Mo' included it on his 2001 album Big Wide Grin

Linda Martell version

Background and recording
In late 1969, "Color Him Father" was notably covered for the country market by Linda Martell. Martell was among country music's first black artists and the first black woman to perform at the Grand Ole Opry. In May 1969 she signed with Shelby Singleton's Plantation label in Nashville, Tennessee. It was soon after her signing that Martell made her first recording sessions in summer 1969. The Winstons' version of "Color Him Father" was brought to Martell's attention through Singleton.

The session was produced entirely by Singleton at "Singleton Sound Studios," located in Nashville. Additional tracks were cut at the same session that would later appear on her 1970 album. The song was cut twice in the studio. In the first take, Singleton found that Martell did not put enough of her own individuality on the record. "I don’t want to hear the Winstons. I want to hear you," he told her.

Release and reception
"Color Him Father" was released several days after its recording. The single of the track was released via the Plantation label in July 1969. It was the debut single of Martell's country music career. The song spent a total of ten weeks on the Billboard Hot Country Songs chart, peaking at number 22 in September 1969. The single became Martell's highest-peaking track on the Country Songs chart. Her next single release would be her last to reach the country top 40. "Color Him Father" was later released on Martell's 1970 studio album, Color Me Country.

Martell's version of "Color Him Father" has since received positive reviews since its original release. In his review of Color Me Country, Mark Deming of Allmusic praised her "rich, smooth voice" on the track, also commenting that it " fares well in a subtle C&W arrangement fortified with pedal steel." Oxford American also praised the song. Reviewer Alice Randall explained how the word "color" in the lyric held a special meaning in Martell's interpretation of the song: "Linda Martell effectively directs, not pleads, not suggests, directs us to understand that stepfather's fundamental identity is as father, not his skin color."

Track listing
7" vinyl single
 "Color Him Father" – 2:20
 "I Almost Called Your Name" – 2:06

Weekly charts

References

1969 songs
1969 debut singles
The Winstons songs
Linda Martell songs
Songs about parenthood
Songs about fathers